Serbia competed at the 2015 World Aquatics Championships in Kazan, Russia from 24 July to 9 August 2015.

Medalists

Open water swimming

Serbia has nominated one swimmer to compete in the open water marathon.

Swimming

Serbian swimmers have achieved qualifying standards in the following events (up to a maximum of 2 swimmers in each event at the A-standard entry time, and 1 at the B-standard):

Men

Women

Mixed

Water polo

Men's tournament

Team roster

Gojko Pijetlović
Dušan Mandić
Živko Gocić
Sava Ranđelović
Miloš Ćuk
Duško Pijetlović
Slobodan Nikić
Milan Aleksić
Nikola Jakšić
Filip Filipović
Andrija Prlainović
Stefan Mitrović
Branislav Mitrović

Group play

Quarterfinals

Semifinals

Final

References

External links
Plivački Savez Srbije 

Nations at the 2015 World Aquatics Championships
2015 in Serbian sport
Serbia at the World Aquatics Championships